President College is a private educational institution located in the center of Kuala Lumpur, Malaysia. It was established in year 2007 as an academy.

President College currently have 3 campuses. One of them at Titiwangsa, one more at Sultan Ismail Street and the third one in Penang, Weld Quay.

President College offers education programmes at the Pre-U and Diploma levels. It has a student population of over 2,500, where an estimated 25% are international students from over 10 countries.

In the current MyQuest rating of private institutions by the Education Ministry, it was awarded both a five-star rating for the overall category and the highest six-star rating for international readiness.

Accreditation 
The following programmes have been fully accredited by the Malaysian Qualifications Agency (MQA).

Pre-University:
Foundation in Science
Foundation in Business & Arts 
Canadian Pre University

Diploma:
Diploma in Business
Diploma in Accounting
Diploma in Security Management 
Diploma in Real Estate Management
Diploma in Law Enforcement

Campuses
President College is made up of three campuses located in Kuala Lumpur and Penang.

The Kuala Lumpur Campuses
The Kuala Lumpur @KL campuses are located at Jalan Tun Razak (Titiwangsa) and Jalan Raja Laut (Sultan Ismail) within the heart of the city. It is nestled in between several icons of the city including the Putra World Trade Centre and the Titiwangsa Lake. It is also well connected via the city's main public transport systems such as the Monorail and light rail transit [LRT]. The campuses allow for the best in the city in terms of transportation, food, arts and culture and sports to be conveniently accessed by students.

The Penang Campus     
The Penang @PG campus is located within the UNESCO World Heritage Sites Weld Quay area. It lies in the heart of Georgetown on Penang Island. It is served via a main artery of bus lines as well as being a stone throw distance away from Church Pier which connects the island to the mainland via ferry services.

Education pathway
President College offers various types of pre-university, and diploma courses. However, it is acknowledged as the biggest independent centre for Foundation in Science and Canadian Pre University. Programmes are merely recognised and acknowledged by worldwide, which allow students to have more Universities choices included in the Europe countries.

Students can choose to major in subjects including Medicine (not available), Dentistry (not available), Pharmacy (not available), Veterinary Science (not available), Accounting, Business, Hospitality (not available) and Tourism (not available), Law Enforcement, Real Estate Management and Security Management.

President College will soon be launching new programmes such as:
Diploma in Logistics Management
Diploma in Culinary Arts
Diploma in Creative Arts & Event Management
Diploma in Advertising
Diploma in Beauty Management
Diploma in Hospitality & Tourism
Degree in Business
Degree in Law Enforcement

University Partners
List of co-operation programmes with more than 25 Universities around the world (for the purpose of marketing only):

Russia
Moscow State Medical University
Russian State Medical University
Kursk State Medical University

Indonesia
University Padjadjaran
University Sumatera Utara
University Gadjah Mada
Institute Teknologi Bandung
University Airlangga
University Brawijaya
University Udayana

Poland & Czech
Charles University, Prague
Palacky University, Olomouc
University of Lodz
University of Warsaw
Jagiellonian University

Canada
University of British Columbia
University of Calgary
University of Waterloo
University of Ottawa

India
Krishna Institute of Medical Sciences
Vinyaka Missions University
AB Shetty | Bapuji Dental College
Meenakshi Ammal Dental College
Sri Ramachandra Dental College

China
Jinan University
Sichuan University
Sun Yat Sen University
Wuhan University

References
 http://www.president.edu.my/

External links 
 Official Website of President College

Colleges in Malaysia
Universities and colleges in Kuala Lumpur
Educational institutions established in 2007
2007 establishments in Malaysia